Tolata Municipality is the third municipal section of the Germán Jordán Province in the Cochabamba Department, Bolivia. Its seat is Tolata.

History
Tolata was the site of a massacre of approximately 100 peasants by the Banzer regime in January 1974.

References 

  Instituto Nacional de Estadistica de Bolivia  (INE)

Municipalities of the Cochabamba Department